Jim or Jimmy Walsh may refer to:

Sportspeople

Footballers
Jimmy Walsh (footballer, born 1901) (1901–1971), English footballer
Jimmy Walsh (footballer, born 1930) (1930–2014), Scottish footballer who played for Celtic and Leicester City
Jimmy Walsh (footballer, born 1954), English footballer

Hurlers
Jim Walsh (Dublin hurler) (1895–1950), Irish hurler
Jim Walsh (Kilkenny hurler) (1933–1995), Irish hurler
Jimmy Walsh (Antrim hurler) (1911–?), Northern Irish—also O'Connell's
Jimmy Walsh (Kilkenny hurler) (1911–1977), Irish hurler—Carrickshock & Kilkenny

Other sports
Jim Walsh (basketball) (1930–1976), American player
Jim Walsh (ice hockey) (born 1956), American League player
Jim Walsh (pitcher) (1894–1967), American baseball player
Jim Walsh (rugby union) (born 1926), rugby union player who represented Australia
Jim Walsh (water polo), former water polo representative from New Zealand
Jimmy Walsh (American boxer) (1883–1964), 1905 American World Bantamweight Champion
Jimmy Walsh (boxer) (1913–1964), British lightweight national boxing champion 1936–38
Jimmy Walsh (infielder) (1886–1947), American baseball player 
Jimmy Walsh (outfielder) (1885–1962), American baseball player

Others
Jim Walsh (Canadian politician) (born 1949), businessperson and former politician in Newfoundland and Labrador
Jim Walsh (columnist) (1903–1990), American authority on early popular recordings
Jim Walsh (Irish politician) (born 1947), Irish Fianna Fáil politician
James P. Walsh (born 1953), known as Jim, American organizational theorist
James T. Walsh (born 1947), known as Jim, American politician
Jim Walsh (Washington politician), member of the Washington State House of Representatives

Characters
Jim Walsh, a character in The Alphabet Killer
Jim Walsh, a character in Beverly Hills, 90210

See also
James Walsh (disambiguation)